Kaboom Town is a nationally recognized fireworks show in Addison, Texas that takes place at Addison Circle Park every July 3 to celebrate the Independence of the United States. With over 400,000 visitors and 1,500 pounds of fireworks, it is the largest fireworks display in the Dallas–Fort Worth metroplex. The celebration features an air show, sponsored by the city's Cavanaugh Flight Museum and Addison Airport, which includes historic warplanes completing flyovers over the park.

Since 2014, the 30-minute pyrotechnics portion of the event has been organized and synchronized by Chad Stanley of Pyro Shows of Texas. It is recognized by the American Pyrotechnics  Association as one of the top ten "must see" Fourth of July events in the nation.
2020 event is canceled; the cause was the COVID-19 pandemic.

References

External links
Official site

Fireworks in the United States
Dallas–Fort Worth metroplex
Articles containing video clips
1985 establishments in Texas
Recurring events established in 1985
Annual events in Texas